Lac Cornu is a lake in the Aiguilles Rouges massif of Haute-Savoie, France. It is located at an elevation of 2276 m with a surface area of 5.4 ha.

Petit Lac Cornu is located 500 m North West, at an elevation of 2243 m. Its surface area is 4700 m².

Cornu